Pseudaristus is a genus of beetles in the family Carabidae, containing the following species:

 Pseudaristus modestus Schaum, 1858
 Pseudaristus punctatissimus Baudi di Selve, 1894

References

Harpalinae